Villars Maître Chocolatier SA is a Swiss chocolate company founded in 1901 and based in the city of Fribourg. The company is noted for its success in selling to tourists, owing to a number of unique products including chocolates with an unusually high percentage of nuts and almonds and 72% cocoa dark chocolate napolitains.

History 
The chocolate company was founded by Wilhelm Kaiser in 1901 in Villars-sur-Glâne.

Villars proposes mostly milk chocolate bars. Among milk chocolate products are terroir milk bars containing milk from a specific region, such as Vaud, Fribourg, Bern and Lucerne (all being located on the Alpine foothills).

The company is today directed by Alexandre Sacerdoti and employs around 140 staff. It is owned by the Savencia Fromage & Dairy group (formerly Soparind Bongrain).

See also
 List of bean-to-bar chocolate manufacturers

References

External links

Swiss chocolate companies
 Companies established in 1901
Swiss companies established in 1901